The 1982 Kansas City Royals season  was their 14th in Major League Baseball. The Royals finished second in the American League West at 90-72, three games behind the California Angels in the first full season as manager for Dick Howser. Hal McRae led the team with 27 home runs and led the American League in runs batted in (133, a single-season franchise record) and doubles (46). Dan Quisenberry's 35 saves was also tops in the American League.

Offseason 
 October 23, 1981: Manny Castillo was traded by the Royals to the Seattle Mariners for a player to be named later. The Mariners completed the deal by sending Bud Black to the Royals on March 2, 1982.
 December 11, 1981: Clint Hurdle was traded by the Royals to the Cincinnati Reds for Scott Brown.
 December 11, 1981: Jerry Martin was traded by the San Francisco Giants to the Kansas City Royals for Rich Gale and Bill Laskey.
 January 14, 1982: Ken Phelps was traded by the Royals to the Montreal Expos for Grant Jackson.
 February 18, 1982: Dennis Littlejohn was traded by the San Francisco Giants to the Kansas City Royals for Jeff Cornell.
 March 23, 1982: Rance Mulliniks was traded by the Royals to the Toronto Blue Jays for Phil Huffman.
 March 30, 1982: Renie Martin, Craig Chamberlain, Atlee Hammaker, and Brad Wellman were traded by the Royals to the San Francisco Giants for Vida Blue and Bob Tufts.

Regular season

Season standings

Record vs. opponents

Notable transactions

Draft picks 
 June 7, 1982: 1982 Major League Baseball draft
 Will Clark was drafted by the Royals in the 4th round, but did not sign.
 Bret Saberhagen was drafted by the Royals in the 19th round. Player signed July 26, 1982.
 Andy Stankiewicz was drafted by the Royals in the 26th round, but did not sign.
 Cecil Fielder was drafted by the Royals in the 4th round of the Secondary Phase. Player signed June 15, 1982.

Roster

Player stats

Batting

Starters by position 
Note: Pos = Position; G = Games played; AB = At bats; H = Hits; Avg. = Batting average; HR = Home runs; RBI = Runs batted in

Other batters 
Note: G = Games played; AB = At bats; H = Hits; Avg. = Batting average; HR = Home runs; RBI = Runs batted in

Pitching

Starting pitchers 
Note: G = Games pitched; IP = Innings pitched; W = Wins; L = Losses; ERA = Earned run average; SO = Strikeouts

Other pitchers 
Note: G = Games pitched; IP = Innings pitched; W = Wins; L = Losses; ERA = Earned run average; SO = Strikeouts

Relief pitchers 
Note: G = Games pitched; W = Wins; L = Losses; SV = Saves; ERA = Earned run average; SO = Strikeouts

Farm system

Notes

References

External links 
 1982 Kansas City Royals at Baseball Reference
 1982 Kansas City Royals at Baseball Almanac

Kansas City Royals seasons
1982 Major League Baseball season
Kansas City